Carmichaelia stevensonii, the cord broom or weeping broom, is a species of plant in the family Fabaceae. It is found only in the north east of the South Island of New Zealand. It is threatened by habitat loss.

Taxonomy
It was first described by Thomas Cheeseman in 1911 as Chordospartium stevensonii, but was reassigned to the genus, Carmichaelia, by Peter Brian Heenan in 1998.

Conservation status
The IUCN redlist listed it as "Vulnerable" in 1998 due to habitat loss. Assessments under the New Zealand Threat Classification System (NZTCS), declared it to be "At Risk – Declining" (Dec) in 2018.

References

stevensonii
Flora of New Zealand
Endangered flora of New Zealand
Vulnerable plants
Plants described in 1911
Taxobox binomials not recognized by IUCN 
Taxa named by Thomas Frederic Cheeseman